Yul Choi is a South Korean activist, environmentalist and organizer. He chaired the Korean Anti-Pollution Movement from 1988, and led the Korean Federation for Environmental Movement from 1993. He was awarded the Global 500 Roll of Honour in 1994 and the Goldman Environmental Prize in 1995. He is currently a president of the Korea Green Foundation.

Current Position
 President of the Korea Green Foundation
 Co-President of Climate Change Center, Korea Green Foundation
 Festival Director of the Green Film Festival in Seoul
 Co-president of Forestry for Life

Experience
 2002 ~ 2005  : Co-president of Korean Federation for Environmental Movement
 2000         : Co-chairman of Citizens Alliance for 2000 General Election
 1998         : Co-president of Forestry for Life Campaign
 1996 ~ 1998  : Chairman of the Korean Eco-labeling Association
 1993 ~ 2002  : Established the Korean Federation for Environmental Movement, Secretary General
 1992         : Head of Korean Nongovernmental Delegates for Rio Earth Summit
 1988         : Co-Chairman of Korea Anti-pollution Movement Association
 1982 ~ 1987  :Chairman of Korean Anti-Pollution Organization

Honors and Activities
 2010  : Cultural Ambassador Prize - Green Planet Movie Awards
 1999  : Worldwatch Magazine’s “World’s 15 Civil Activists” Award
 1997  : National Recognition in commemoration of World Environmental Day
 1995  : Goldman Environmental Prize
 1994  : Global 500 Roll of Honour by UNEP
 1993  : Seoul Lawyer Association’s “Civil Rights” Award

Publications
 2010  : Study Book of Climate Change
 2009  : My life with Environmental Actions for 33 years 
 2007  : Boomerang Effect of Global Warming / Yul Choi’s Stories about Global Warming
 2002  : Global Environmental Story of Yul Choi 1,2
 1996  : Everything which is Living is Beautiful.
 1994(1,2) 1997(3)  : Our Environmental Story 1,2,3
 1988  : Multi-Pollution - A novel
 1986  : Pollution Map of Korea

References

External links
 Official website of Choi Yul 

South Korean environmentalists
1949 births
Living people
Goldman Environmental Prize awardees